Vidyadhar Shastri (1901–1983) was a Sanskrit poet and a scholar of Sanskrit and Hindi. He was born in the city of Churu in Rajasthan (India), received the degree of Shastri  from Punjab University (Lahore), a Master of Arts in Sanskrit from the University of Agra and resided at the city of Bikaner during the bulk of his scholarly and academic endeavours.  In 1962, he was conferred the honour of Vidyavachaspati by the President of India.

Academic appointments
In 1928 Vidyadhar Shastri was appointed lecturer in Sanskrit at Dungar College in Bikaner and became Head, Department of Sanskrit in 1936. After retiring from Dungar College in 1956, Vidyadhar Shastri served as Head, Department of Sanskrit at Hiralal Barahsaini College, Aligarh.  In 1958, he established the Hindi Vishwa Bharati (Bikaner) for the promotion of Sanskrit, Hindi and Rajasthani literature. He served as lifetime head of this institute.

Teaching
In addition to being the Guru for the royal household of Bikaner, Shastri mentored and inspired many students. Prominent names of these students include Swami Narottamdas, Brahmanand Sharma, Kashiram Sharma, Krishna Mehta and Rawat Saraswat.

Authorship
The Sanskrit Mahakavya (epic poem), Haranamamritam may appear at first glance to be a biography of his grandfather Harnamdutt Shastri, however, the primary purpose is to inspire its readers to devote themselves to improve the world.  In the other Mahakavya, Vishwamanaviyam the poet addresses the impact of modernisation and the 1969 moon landing.  Vikramabhinnadanam illustrates the cultural traditions during the rule of Chandragupta Vikramaditya and memorialises Shankracharya, Rani Padmvati, Rana Pratap, Guru Govind Singh, Shivaji and others continuing these traditions.  The Vaichitraya Lahari is an entreaty to the populace to a reflect on their unrestrained behaviour.  Written in a humorous vein, the Matta Lahari's protagonist is a drunkard (matta in Sanskrit),who invites everyone to free themselves from the bonds of society and join him in the tavern.  Anand Mandakini is complementary to the Matta Lahari; here the drunkard's companion exhorts him to garner some accomplishments as the time spent drinking will be irretrievable. Himadri Mahatyam was written in the year of the centennial celebration of Madan Mohan Malaviya and the Indo-China war of 1962; in the poem Madan Mohan Malaviya asks all Indians to defend the Himalaya. Shakuntala Vigyanam is a commentary on the Kalidasa play Abhigyana Shakuntalam, in which the poet illustrates that the spirit of love permeates the work.

The Shiva pushpanjali is the poet's first published work (1915); it does not used a fixed metre and also uses the style of ghazals and qawwalis. Surya Stavana was published at the same time as Shiva pushpanjali. In Lila Lahari the poet acquaints the reader with all the branches of Indian philosophy with Advaita being the fundamental form.

Purnanandanam
The Sanskrit play Purnanandanam is based on a popular folk tale; the protagonist Purnamala is the son born to the King of Sialkot but due to adverse astrological signs has to be sent away for sixteen years.  During this interval the king takes another (younger) wife named Naveena. When Purnamala returns Naveena is attracted to him; however, Purnamala rejects her advances. Miffed, Naveena causes the King to sentence Purnamala to death on charges of attempted rape. Purnamala is taken to the forest to be beheaded, instead the executioners throw him down a well. Guru Gorakhnath and his followers rescue Purnamala from the well. After receiving education from the Guru, Purnamala is instructed to return to Sialkot. On Purnamala's return to the palace, the now aged King breaks down in tears and hugs Purnamala. At the beseeching of Purnamala's mother, Guru Gorakhnath manifests at the palace. He instructs Purnamala to stay in Sialkot until Naveena's son capable of taking the reins of power.

This play celebrates the superiority of leading a spiritual life over the pursuit of material wealth.

Awards and honours
Felicitated (with other Sanskrit scholars) by the President of India, Dr Rajendra Prasad at the Vishwa Sanskrit Parishad, Varanasi.
Received the honour of Vidyavaschaspati  from Sarvapalli Radhakrishnan in 1962 at the golden anniversary celebration of the Akhil Bharatiya Sanskrit Sammelan.
Bestowed the honour of Manishi  by the Rajasthan Sahitya Academy, Udaipur.
Honored as a Sanskrit scholar by the President of India Shri V.V. Giri in 1972 at the silver anniversary celebration of India's independence.
Honored as Kavi Smarat by the Akhil Bharatiya Sanskrit Prachar Sabha
In 1980 received public felicitation at a ceremony under the auspices of the Bharatiya Vidya Mandir in Bikaner
Honored at the 1982 Harit Rishi  memorial felicitation by the Maharana Mewar foundation in recognition of outstanding service to development of culture

Bibliography

Sanskrit Mahakavya
Haranamamritam
Vishwamanaviyam

Sanskrit poems
Vikramabhinnadanam
Vaichitraya Lahari
Matta Lahari
Anand Mandakini
Himadri Mahatyam
Shakuntala Vigyanam
Alidurg Darshanam

Stavanakavya (Songs of praise)
Shiva pushpanjali
Surya Stavana
Lila Lahari

Plays in Sanskrit
Purnanandanam
Kalidainyam
Durbala Balam

Champu Kavya ( a Champu contains both poetry and prose)
Vikramabhyudayam

Collected works
Vidyadhar granthavali, introduction by Vishnudutt Sharma, Publisher : Rajasthan Sahitya Akadami, Udaipur 1977

Edited work
Krishnagitavali (poems about Krishna by Tulsidas), Editors: Narottamdas Swami and Vidyadhar Shastri, Published 1931

Source material
Sarasvat, Parmanand (1984) Sahityasrashta Shri Vidyadhar Shastri, Ganu Prakashan, Bikaner

External links
Sahityasrashta at Library of Congress
Haranamamritam at Library of Congress
Granthavali at Library of Congress
Krishnagitavali at Library of Congress

1901 births
1983 deaths
Date of birth missing
Date of death missing
People from Churu district
Place of death missing
Rajasthani people
Indian Sanskrit scholars
Sanskrit writers
University of the Punjab alumni
Poets from Rajasthan
20th-century Indian poets